Paul England (17 June 1892  died 21st November 1968 in Newton St Cyres Devon was an English actor, singer, author. Served in Royal Horse Artillery in First World War. In Second World War worked for British Government on Lend Lease programme and was awarded 
a United States Congressional medal .

Born at Streatham in 1893, England was educated at Whitgift School. Beyond his career as an actor and broadcaster, he was also a singer and writer. As a singer, he appeared in musicals in London's West End and on Broadway.

England's first film was Just a Girl (1916), in the silent era, in which he played a miner who gets the girl, opposite Daisy Burrell. He later appeared in Knee Deep in Daisies (1926) and in the era of talking films had roles in Charlie Chan in London (1934), Disputed Passage (1939), The Invisible Man Returns (1940) The Earl of Chicago (1940), and The Trial of Madame X  (1948), the last of which he also wrote and directed.

Notes

External links
Paul England at IMDb

1893 births
1968 deaths
English male film actors
English male stage actors
People educated at Whitgift School